(7 July 1919 – 4 September 2014) was a Japanese rōkyoku singer. He died at the age of 95.

References

1919 births
2014 deaths
Musicians from Kagawa Prefecture
20th-century Japanese musicians
20th-century Japanese male singers
20th-century Japanese singers